Montgomery County Jail and Sheriff's Residence is a historic jail and sheriff's residence located at Crawfordsville, Montgomery County, Indiana. It was built in 1882 in two sections, and is a -story, red brick and limestone building in a combination of Italianate, Gothic Revival, and Romanesque Revival style architecture.  The jail is a "rotary jail"; it is the only example of this type in Indiana and one of two left in the United States. The building houses a local history and prison museum.

It was listed on the National Register of Historic Places in 1975. It is located in the Crawfordsville Commercial Historic District.

References

External links

Prison museums in the United States
Historic American Engineering Record in Indiana
History museums in Indiana
Jails on the National Register of Historic Places in Indiana
Italianate architecture in Indiana
Gothic Revival architecture in Indiana
Romanesque Revival architecture in Indiana
Government buildings completed in 1882
Buildings and structures in Montgomery County, Indiana
National Register of Historic Places in Montgomery County, Indiana
Historic district contributing properties in Indiana
Jails in Indiana
Houses on the National Register of Historic Places in Indiana
Crawfordsville, Indiana